The Greater Sandhill Solar Plant is a 19 megawatt (MWAC) photovoltaic power station in the San Luis Valley, located near the town of Mosca, Colorado.   It was the largest solar facility in the state when it came online at the end of 2010.   The electricity is being sold to Public Service of Colorado, a subsidiary of Xcel Energy, under a long-term power purchase agreement.

Facility details

The facility occupies about 200 acres of a 320 acre plot of water-constrained former agricultural land, and is sited adjacent to the Alamosa photovoltaic power plant which was completed two years earlier.  It was developed and built by SunPower using the company's most-advanced high-efficiency technology.  It contains about 50,000 modules which are mounted onto T-20 trackers. This tracker design was newly released in 2010, and was marketed as enabling the highest production.

The plant is owned by Metlife and John Hancock Financial Services, which also partnered to finance the construction.  Buesing Corp of Phoenix AZ was contracted to set the 16,800 helical screw pile foundations.  The facility was completed in nine months, and was at full production by the end of December 2010.   The start of commercial operations was announced in March 2011.

Electricity production

See also

 Alamosa Photovoltaic Power Plant
 San Luis Valley Solar Ranch
 Solar power in Colorado
 Solar power in the United States
 Renewable energy in the United States
 Renewable portfolio standard

External links 
 VIDEO: Sunpower T20 Tracker Installation

References

Buildings and structures in Alamosa County, Colorado
Photovoltaic power stations in Colorado
Photovoltaic power stations in the United States
Energy infrastructure completed in 2010